The men's pole vault at the 2019 Asian Athletics Championships was held on 21 April. It was won by Ernest John Obiena of the Philippines with a new Championships record of 5.71 metres, which was also the new national record for his country. He was followed on the podium by two Chinese vaulters, Zhang Wei and Huang Bokai, both recording season's bests. The defending champion, Ding Bangchao, also of China, did not compete.

Results

References
Results

Pole
Pole vault at the Asian Athletics Championships